Wenda Nel (née Theron; born 30 July 1988) is a South African athlete specialising in the 400 metres hurdles. She competed at the 2011 World Championships reaching the semifinals.

She competed in the women's 400 metres hurdles at the 2020 Summer Olympics.

Her personal best in the event is 54.37 from 20 May 2015.

Competition record

Personal bests
 400 metres 52.03 s (2017)
 400 metres hurdles 54.37s (2015)

References

1988 births
Living people
People from Worcester, South Africa
South African female hurdlers
Olympic athletes of South Africa
Athletes (track and field) at the 2016 Summer Olympics
Athletes (track and field) at the 2014 Commonwealth Games
Athletes (track and field) at the 2018 Commonwealth Games
World Athletics Championships athletes for South Africa
African Games silver medalists for South Africa
African Games medalists in athletics (track and field)
Commonwealth Games medallists in athletics
Commonwealth Games bronze medallists for South Africa
Athletes (track and field) at the 2011 All-Africa Games
Athletes (track and field) at the 2019 African Games
South African Athletics Championships winners
Competitors at the 2009 Summer Universiade
Competitors at the 2011 Summer Universiade
Athletes (track and field) at the 2020 Summer Olympics
Sportspeople from the Western Cape
20th-century South African women
21st-century South African women
Medallists at the 2018 Commonwealth Games